O. palustris may refer to:

Oryzomys palustris, the marsh rice rat, a semiaquatic North American rodent.
Ortalis palustris, a species of ulidiid or picture-winged fly in the genus Ortalis of the family Ulidiidae.

See also
 Palustris (disambiguation)